Mytishchi Arena is a multi-purpose indoor sporting arena that is located in Mytishchi, which is 5 km (3 miles) outside of Moscow, Russia.

The arena is used to host events such as: ice hockey, figure skating, basketball, volleyball, handball, tennis, badminton, futsal, artistic gymnastics, gymnastics, ice dancing, ballroom dancing, wrestling, Olympic weightlifting, boxing, concerts, festivals, exhibitions, conferences, dance evenings, circus performances, fashion shows, and other events. The capacity of the arena is 7,000 for ice hockey, 7,280 for basketball, and 9,000 for boxing and concerts.

History
Mytishchi Arena was opened on October 15, 2005. Along with the Khodynka Arena, it hosted the 2007 Men's World Ice Hockey Championships. The arena has been used as the home arena of the Russian Kontinental Hockey League club, Atlant Moscow Oblast. In 2017, the basketball club Khimki, started using the arena for their 2017–18 EuroLeague games.

Due to the on-going travel restrictions against COVID-19 pandemic, ice hockey team Kunlun Red Star determined that they would be unable to play in Beijing, China for the 2020-21 KHL season. In August, the club signed a contract to play out of Arena Mytishchi.

See also
 List of Kontinental Hockey League arenas

References

External links

www.arena-mo.ru - Official website 
Image 1 of Mytishchi Arena's Interior
Image 2 of Mytishchi Arena's Interior
Video of Mytishchi Arena

Atlant Moscow Oblast
Basketball venues in Russia
Boxing venues in Russia
Buildings and structures in Moscow Oblast
Indoor arenas in Russia
Music venues in Russia
Indoor ice hockey venues in Russia
Kontinental Hockey League venues
Mytishchinsky District
Sports venues completed in 2005
2005 establishments in Russia
KRS Vanke Rays